Alfredo Colombo (born 25 July 1921) is an Italian retired professional football player.

1921 births
Possibly living people
Italian footballers
Serie A players
Inter Milan players
U.S. Pistoiese 1921 players
U.S. Alessandria Calcio 1912 players
S.S.D. Sanremese Calcio players
Association football midfielders
S.G. Gallaratese A.S.D. players
Footballers from Lombardy
Sportspeople from the Metropolitan City of Milan